Downshire may refer to the following:

Antarctica
 Downshire Cliffs

Northern Ireland
 County Down
 Downshire Hospital, psychiatric hospital at Downpatrick, County Down
 Downshire School, Carrickfergus, County Antrim
 Downshire railway station, Carrickfergus, County Antrim
 Downshire Young Men F.C., Hillsborough, County Down
 Downshire, electoral area of Lisburn City Council
 Marquess of Downshire

England
 Downshire Hill, street in Hampstead, London